{{Infobox Fraternity 
|name = Alpha Psi
|letters = 
|crest = File:Crest_of_Alpha_Psi_Professional_Veterinary_Fraternity.jpg
|image_size = 180px
|colors =  Dark blue and  Bright gold 
|flower = Red Carnation
|publication = Alpha Psi Quarterly"
|birthplace = Ohio State University College of Veterinary Medicine
|affiliation = Independent
|founded = 
|scope = national
|chapters = 18 installed; 8 active
|type = Professional
|emphasis = Veterinary
|homepage = 
}}
Alpha Psi is a professional Veterinary Medicine fraternity started at the Ohio State University College of Veterinary Medicine in 1907.

 History 
Founded by twenty-two students in Veterinary Medicine at the Ohio State University, Alpha Psi was established on January 18, 1907. The fraternity gradually spread to other Colleges of Veterinary Medicine when students formed chapters at many veterinary schools in the United States.Delta chapter and Gamma chapter became inactive when their host schools closed.

 Chapters 
Following are the chapters of Alpha Psi. Active chapters are indicated in bold. Inactive chapters are in italic''.

Notes

References 

Student organizations established in 1907
Student societies in the United States
Professional fraternities and sororities in the United States
Veterinary medicine-related professional associations
1907 establishments in Ohio
Veterinary medicine in the United States